Mirrool is a town in the northern part of the Riverina region of south-west New South Wales, Australia.

The place name Mirrool is derived from the local Aboriginal word meaning "Pipe Clay".

Mirrool Post Office opened on 16 November 1911 and closed in 1982. A railway station opened with the opening of the railway line in 1908, and closed in 1985 after passenger services ceased in 1983.

The town's pub was built between 1913 and 1916 and opened in 1917. In recent times it was narrowly saved when a group of local farmers banded together to buy the licence just before it was sold off to Sydney (Liquor licences can be sold to another concern and then reinstated in a different location).

The town also has a football oval and —despite how far north Mirrool is in New South Wales— the style of football played in the town is Australian rules football as it lies within the Australian Rules area of the narrow wheatbelt stretching north from the Canola Way and centred on the Newell Highway. Every second Saturday in October the town holds a large gathering to which Australian Rules fans congregate to compete in the $1000 prize for kicking a football over the 32 metre silos that are situated opposite the pub.  This event commenced in 1992 with the winner that year being Billy Brownless.  The winner has been the silos on some occasions.

Gallery

References

External links

Mirrool Railway Siding
 Prime TV coverage of Silo Kick

Towns in the Riverina
Towns in New South Wales
Newell Highway